Kammaneh is a Bedouin village in northern Israel. It is the result of the merger between Sawae'd (Kammaneh East) and Kamun (Kammaneh West). Located near Mount Kamun (Jabal Kamun) and to the north of Sakhnin, it falls under the jurisdiction of Misgav Regional Council.

History
Kammaneh was founded in the early 19th century when Negev Bedouins began to establish permanent settlements in the Galilee. The Suweid tribe who were one of the first Bedouin tribes to settle in the region found an area atop Mount Kamon (Jabal Kamun) and they named it Kammana or "ambush". They, like most Arabs in the Galilee depended on agriculture for survival.

In 1963, Israeli authorities declared Kammaneh or Area 9 as a military training zone endangering inhabitants by stray bullets or mortar rounds. Two years later the village was declared "unrecognized"  by the Israeli Ministry of Interior as a part of the Planning and Construction Law.

In 1995 the Kammaneh was officially recognized by the government and was placed under the jurisdiction of Misgav Regional Council. The village consists of six neighborhoods.

In November 2008, the Clore Multi-Purpose Community Center was established in Kammaneh. The center offers daytime and after-school activities, a health clinic operated by the Clalit Health Fund and a well-baby clinic.

See also
 Arab localities in Israel
 Bedouin in Israel
 Negev Bedouins

References

External links
History of Kamanneh
Survey of Western Palestine, Map 6: IAA, Wikimedia commons

Arab villages in Israel
Bedouin localities in Israel
Misgav Regional Council
Populated places in Northern District (Israel)